The Suru Alliance (AS) was a political alliance in Benin.

History
The alliance was established in 1999, to contest the parliamentary elections that year, and consisted of the Union for Democracy and National Reconstruction, the Forum for Democracy, Development and Morality, the Union for Homeland and Progress and the National Forum of Civil and Civic Awakening. It received 1.5% of the vote, winning a single seat taken by Gado Girigissou.

References

1999 establishments in Benin
Defunct political party alliances in Benin
Political parties established in 1999
Political parties with year of disestablishment missing